Cihat is a Turkish given name for males. It is the Turkish form of the Arabic name and word Jihad ِ(Arabic: جِهاد jihād). People named Cihat include:

 Cihat Arman, Turkish football goalkeeper
 Hasan Cihat Örter, Turkish guitarist
 Cihat Teğin, Turkish fencer

See also
 / , a Turkish merchant ship in service 1933-38

Turkish masculine given names